Vulcan Pass is a mountain pass in the Hunedoara county of Romania, on the Jiu valley. The nearby city of Vulcan is named after the pass.

Mountain passes of Romania
Mountain passes of the Carpathians